Julio José Iglesias Preysler (born 25 February 1973) is a Spanish singer. In 2008, he was declared the winner of the CMT competition Gone Country.

Early life
He was born Julio José Iglesias-Preysler (before a later name change) in Madrid, Spain, the son of Spanish singer Julio Iglesias and Filipina socialite and "Hola!" magazine journalist Isabel Preysler. He is the younger brother of Chabeli Iglesias and the older brother of Enrique Iglesias. His parents divorced in 1979. Iglesias Jr. and his siblings moved to Miami to live with their father. Iglesias Jr. went to college near San Francisco at Menlo College in Atherton, California. He won a chance to participate in NBC's Out of the Blue and he worked for the Travel Channel, where he hosted a travel show that took him to Latin America.

Career
Iglesias Jr., with the help of his friend and manager Darius Jordi Lassus, first got into show business as a model. It was his manager that negotiated an exclusive male modeling agreement with Joey Hunter (at the time he was the president of the Male Model division) at the Ford Models Agency in New York. It was through Joey Hunter, that Iglesias Jr. was discovered by photographer Bruce Weber. He went on to campaign for Versace. Shortly after, Iglesias Jr. signed on with publicity executive Ruben Malaret who began a press campaign to further gain exposure of Iglesias Jr. to the English speaking entertainment industry. Some of his notable accomplishments was his participation on Oprah Winfrey's talk show and was featured in an advertisement for Gap and he modeled for designer John Bartlett VII on Sixth Fashion Show.

He was offered two soap opera jobs, one at Televisa and one in the ABC soap opera All My Children. Iglesias Jr. also received an offer from the Producers of the Broadway show Grease to star as Danny, but decided to turn down these job offers because he wanted to focus on his music. Iglesias Jr. signed a recording agreement with Epic Records and he traveled to Miami where he began to record his first album, Under My Eyes, with Rodolfo Castillo. Released in 1999, the recording of this album took them to New York City and Los Angeles, two songs released from this English language album are "One More Chance" and "Under My Eyes". Among promotional appearances for the album, Iglesias Jr. performed "One More Chance" at the Miss Universe 1999 Pageant and opened for Cher on her tour of North America. The album failed to gain success in the United States and soon after Iglesias Jr. departed from Epic Records.

Iglesias Jr's. second album, Tercera Dimension, was released in 2003 on the Warner Music Group and featured Spanish pop rock songs with the singles "Los Demas" and "Dejame Volar". Both albums received public interest from the Hispanic media in the United States but attained minority success.

He worked for Hola Magazine, appearing in several photoshoots. More recently he has taken part in a series in Spain called Club de Flo, in which Spanish politicians and celebrities have to present a comedy routine. The show was unsuccessful and cancelled after several episodes. He has moved back to Spain and is living with his mother Isabel Preysler. He appeared on the Spanish version of Dancing with the Stars called "¡Mira quien baila!" but was voted out in the thirteenth week. He has played the lead role in a drama film entitled The Music of You directed by Lloyd DeSouza.

In 2008, Iglesias Jr. was the winner of the first season of CMT reality Television show Gone Country, in which artists from other genres of music lived together in a house in Nashville and competed to win a country music contract. His single "The Way I Want You" was released to country radio on 10 March 2008 and was produced by Gone Country host John Rich. Iglesias Jr. also appeared on the ABC TV show the superstars. He was partnered with soccer player Brandi Chastain; they finished in fourth place in the competition.

In 2014, he joined the band Latin Lovers with Nuno Resende and Damien Sargue.

In 2015, he performed a concert (complete show) for the first time with his father Julio Iglesias in a tour in Romania, on 22 May at Sala Polivalentă in Cluj-Napoca and 2 July at Sala Palatului in the capital Bucharest.

Personal life
In October 1999, he legally changed his name from Julio José Iglesias to Julio Iglesias Jr. In May 2011, Iglesias Jr. was engaged to Belgian model Charisse Verhaert (born 1982) after 7 years of dating; the religious wedding took place on 3 November 2012 in Aldea del Fresno, Spain. In August 2020, a petition for divorce was filed in the Miami Court.

Iglesias is a Catholic and descendant of the religious Filipino-Spanish clan Arrastia from the Arrastia family of Lubao, Pampanga the Philippines.

Discography

Albums

Singles

References

External links 
 Official Site Latin Lovers

1973 births
Living people
21st-century Spanish singers
Bailando por un Sueño (Argentine TV series) participants
EMI Records artists
English-language singers from Spain
Epic Records artists
Julio Jr.
Participants in American reality television series
Participants in Argentine reality television series
People from Madrid
Singers from Madrid
Singing talent show winners
Spanish emigrants to the United States
Spanish expatriates in the United States
Spanish male models
Spanish male singers
Spanish people of American descent
Spanish people of Filipino descent
Spanish people of Jewish descent
Spanish people of Kapampangan descent
Spanish people of Puerto Rican descent